Velin Mitkov Damyanov (Bulgarian: Велин Митков Дамянов) (born 8 August 1988) is a Bulgarian football player, currently playing as a defender for Chrobry Głogów.

References 

1988 births
Living people
Bulgarian footballers
Association football defenders
PFC Chernomorets Burgas players
FC Pomorie players
Neftochimic Burgas players
First Professional Football League (Bulgaria) players